In geography and geology, fluvial processes are associated with rivers and streams and the deposits and landforms created by them. When the stream or rivers are associated with glaciers, ice sheets, or ice caps, the term glaciofluvial or fluvioglacial is used.

Fluvial processes

Fluvial processes include the motion of sediment and erosion or deposition on the river bed.

The movement of water across the stream bed exerts a shear stress directly onto the bed. If the cohesive strength of the substrate is lower than the shear exerted, or the bed is composed of loose sediment which can be mobilized by such stresses, then the bed will be lowered purely by clearwater flow. In addition, if the river carries significant quantities of sediment, this material can act as tools to enhance wear of the bed (abrasion). At the same time the fragments themselves are ground down, becoming smaller and more rounded (attrition).

Sediment in rivers is transported as either bedload (the coarser fragments which move close to the bed) or suspended load (finer fragments carried in the water). There is also a component carried as dissolved material.

For each grain size there is a specific flow velocity at which the grains start to move, called entrainment velocity. However the grains will continue to be transported even if the velocity falls below the entrainment velocity due to the reduced (or removed) friction between the grains and the river bed. Eventually the velocity will fall low enough for the grains to be deposited. This is shown by the Hjulström curve.

A river is continually picking up and dropping solid particles of rock and soil from its bed throughout its length. Where the river flow is fast, more particles are picked up than dropped. Where the river flow is slow, more particles are dropped than picked up. Areas where more particles are dropped are called alluvial or flood plains, and the dropped particles are called alluvium.

Even small streams make alluvial deposits, but it is in floodplains and deltas of large rivers that large, geologically-significant alluvial deposits are found.

The amount of matter carried by a large river is enormous. It has been estimated that the Mississippi River annually carries 406 million tons of sediment to the sea, the Yellow River 796 million tons, and the Po River in Italy 67 million tons. The names of many rivers derive from the color that the transported matter gives the water. For example, the Yellow River (Huang He) in China is named after the hue of the sediment it carries, and the White Nile is named for the clay it carries.

See also
 Body of water

Fluvial processes

 (solution)

Fluvial channel patterns

Fluvial landforms

 (watershed)

Fluvial landforms of streams

 (Gorge)

Related terms
lacustrine – of or relating to a lake
maritime – of or relating to a sea
oceanic – of or relating to an ocean
palustrine – of or relating to a marsh

References

Hydrology
 
Sedimentology
Geomorphology